The Belle Vue Colts are the junior youth development team of the Belle Vue Aces, one of the World's most famous motorcycle speedway team, based in Manchester in the northwest of England.

History
Belle Vue first operated a reserve team during the 1934 Speedway National League which finished 6th in the league table. Three years later in the 1937 Provincial Speedway League the Belle Vue reserve side took over the fixtures of Liverpool Merseysiders and in the 1939 Speedway National League Division Two the Belle Vue reserves replaced Stoke Potters. In the mid 1950s Belle Vue ran a few "second" team events when the Aces were away from home.

The Belle Vue Colts side was formed by former Aces rider Dent Oliver, who became General Manager of Belle Vue Aces in 1967. Oliver's arrival brought sweeping changes to the club's approach as he recognised that if the club was to remain at the very top of British Speedway it needed a way of developing its own young riders. Oliver quickly introduced the now legendary Monday night training schools which he hoped would provide for Belle Vue's future. His efforts brought huge and immediate rewards, with youngsters coming from the north of England to become a part of Belle Vue's roster.

Belle Vue were invited to enter a team of their raw youngsters alongside former provincial league teams like Middlesbrough Bears, Plymouth Devils and Rayleigh Rockets, and the new division roared into life on Wednesday 8 May 1968 with Belle Vue defeating Canterbury 55-23 in the first ever second division match. The Colts went through that maiden season unbeaten at home and clinched the league title on Wednesday 28 August when they beat Weymouth 63-15 (the most convincing victory of the season). Twelve months later The Colts retained their Second Division title and even went one better by adding the Knock-Out Cup to the trophy cabinet. Many of the riders used in those two debut seasons went on to further their careers at first division level.

In 1970, the Belle Vue management looked for a new home for their nursery team, and this was found at Rochdale where the Colts moved — still under the control of Belle Vue — to become the Rochdale Hornets. Rochdale finished third in the 1970 Second Division and reached the semi-finals of the knock-out cup. The Hornets closed after finishing ninth in the 1971 championship, but not before unearthing the biggest talent that the second division was ever to produce: the 16-year-old Peter Collins.

The Belle Vue Colts have continued in various competitions, usually as second half events after the Aces' matches. Notable successes include the 1978 Scottish Junior League title, the 1989 British League 2 Championship and K.O. Cup double and the 2001 and 2002 Northern Youth Development titles. Joe Screen, Carl Stonehewer, Scott Smith, Lee Smethills, Ricky Ashworth and James Wright all moved on to a higher level.

Since 2016 the team have competed in league competition and currently are part of the 2021 National Development League speedway season.

Previous teams 

2019 team

  Jordan Palin
  Leon Flint
  Kyle Bickley
  Connor Bailey
  Danny Phillips
  Ben Woodhull
  Ben Rathbone

2021 team

Jack Smith 8.87
Benji Compton 8.86
Harry McGurk 7.35
Jake Parkinson-Blackburn 7.08
Connor Coles 6.75
Paul Bowen 6.00
Sam McGurk 5.94
Ben Woodhull 3.45

2022 team

 8.72
 8.67
 8.30
 7.68
 6.75
 6.31
 5.61

Full season summary

References

Sport in Manchester
British speedway teams